The 1987 United Jersey Bank Classic was a women's tennis tournament played on outdoor hard courts at the Ramapo College in Mahwah, New Jersey in the United States and was part of Category 3 tier of the 1987 Virginia Slims World Championship Series. It was the 10th edition of the tournament and was held from August 24 through August 30, 1987. Third-seeded Manuela Maleeva won the singles title.

Finals

Singles
 Manuela Maleeva defeated  Sylvia Hanika 1–6, 6–4, 6–1

Doubles
 Gigi Fernández /  Lori McNeil defeated  Anne Hobbs /  Elizabeth Smylie 6–3, 6–2

References

External links
 ITF tournament edition details

United Jersey Bank Classic
WTA New Jersey
United Jersey Bank Classic
United Jersey Bank Classic
United Jersey Bank Classic